The Australian Office of Financial Management (AOFM) is a part of the Department of the Treasury (Australia). It manages the Australian Government's net debt portfolio. Its reports on debt management directed at ensuring that the Commonwealth net debt portfolio is managed at least cost, subject to the Government's policies and risk references.

References

Commonwealth Government agencies of Australia
Government finances in Australia
Financial management organizations